Madison County School District (MCSD) or Madison County Schools is a public school district (K-12) with its headquarters located in Madison, Florida.

It serves all of Madison County.

Schools and facilities
High school:
Madison County High School - unincorporated, west of Madison

PK-8 schools:
Madison County Central School - unincorporated, west of Madison

Primary schools:
Greenville Elementary School - Greenville
Pinetta Elementary School - Pinetta
Lee Elementary School - Lee

References

School districts in Florida
Education in Madison County, Florida